100 Minutes of Glory is a 2004 Croatian biographical drama film directed by Dalibor Matanić.

Cast
 Sanja Vejnović as Slava Raškaj
 Miki Manojlović as Bela Čikoš Sesija
 Vili Matula as Rapacki
 Nataša Lušetić as Justina
 Krunoslav Šarić as Slava's Father
 Nada Gačešić as Slava's Mother
 Luka Petrušić as Slava's Brother
 Darko Rundek as Charles Dubayer
 Maja Anušić as Young Slava
 Ivana Bolanča as Klara
 Jasna Beri as Marica
 Krešimir Mikić as Imri the Fiancé
 Bojan Navojec as Marko from the Salon
 Milan Živković as Lion from the Salon

References

Further reading

External links
 

2004 films
2004 drama films
2004 biographical drama films
2000s Croatian-language films
Croatian biographical drama films
Biographical films about painters
Films directed by Dalibor Matanić
Cultural depictions of Croatian people
Cultural depictions of 19th-century painters
Cultural depictions of 20th-century painters
Films set in Croatia
Films shot in Croatia